Denham Springs Freshman High (DSFH) is a high school in Denham Springs, Louisiana, United States that consists of mostly  freshman, few sophomores cross over the street from the Denham High School to the Freshman High to complete certain classes, if needed .

DSFH is affiliated and located adjacent to Denham Springs High School.

DSFH has 11 clubs and 16 sports.

References

Public high schools in Louisiana
Schools in Livingston Parish, Louisiana